Charles-Joseph-Marie Schilling, CRSP (9 June 1835 - 2 January 1907) was born in Christiania, Norway. He was an atheist (nominally Lutheran) convert to Catholicism, which he first came into contact with when he was nineteen years old and studying art in Düsseldorf. He was received into the Catholic Church on 11 November 1854. 

Gradually, as he spent more and more of his time in prayer and charity work, he gave up his painting. He was ordained a priest at Bourges, France, on 18 December 1875.

Schilling became a spiritual director in the Barnabite Order (Clerics Regular of St Paul). He worked mainly in France, Italy and Belgium. His last years were spent in Mouscron, Belgium, where his evident holiness led people to call him "the tall saint" (because of his height) or "the saint of Mouscron". Shortly after his death people began to flock to his grave, and on 24 March 1936 his body was moved to the Barnabite Church, where it was placed in a side chapel. His grave is still frequently visited by pilgrims.

Known also as Karl Schilling, he is the only post-Reformation Norwegian cleric to be officially considered for sainthood by the Catholic Church. He has been declared Venerable.

Books
 Undset, Sigrid, A Priest From Norway - The Venerable Karl Schilling, translated by the Barnabite Fathers.

References

External links
 Schilling biodata
 Barnabites (archived)

1835 births
1907 deaths
20th-century Belgian Roman Catholic priests
Converts to Roman Catholicism from atheism or agnosticism
Members of the Barnabite Order
Norwegian emigrants to France
Place of birth missing
Place of death missing
19th-century French Roman Catholic priests